The K-class ferries were a group of double-ended screw steam ferries run by Sydney Ferries Limited and its government successors on Sydney Harbour. The company introduced more than two dozen of the vessels from the 1890s through to the early twentieth century to meet the booming demand for ferry services across Sydney Harbour prior to the opening of the Sydney Harbour Bridge in 1932.

The K-names were largely Australian Aboriginal names with their meanings listed in the table below.

Design
The K-class were not a group of identical ferries - they were delivered in batches of two or three identical sister ships - rather they were a general type of vessel that ranged in sized but shared a typical form. They were all double-deck, double-ended screw steamers with two raised wheelhouses and a single tall funnel. Apart from a few early vessels with open upper decks that were later enclosed, the K-class had enclosed upper and lower saloons with lower deck outdoor seating around the vessel, and the upper decks had smaller outdoor areas at either end around the wheelhouses. The boats were all timber-hulled with timber superstructures, except for four later and larger vessels that had steel hulls and timber superstructures - namely, sisters Kanangra and Kirawa (both 1912) and sisters Kuttabul and Koompartoo (both 1922). The boats' upper deck sheer or profile line were curved parallel to the hull sheer, in contrast to many contemporary ferries whose upper deck was built straight fore and aft.

Kareela was the first of Sydney Ferries Limited to have upper decks fully enclosed. The earlier K-class vessels, including Kurraba, Kirribilli, Koree and Kulgoa had only the sides of their upper decks enclosed leaving the ends open, with the roofs being squared off. On Kareela and all subsequent K-class vessels had an upper deck structure with curving roof lines that met at the rear of the wheelhouses thus the upper deck saloon was fully enclosed. Sliding doors gave access to the a small unroofed area surrounding the raised wheelhouses.

Service history

The ferry trade to the North Shore increased rapidly and consistently from the turn of the century until the opening of the Sydney Harbour Bridge in 1932. The Sydney Ferries fleet became one of the largest in the world - the bulk of which in number and capacity were K-class - and carried 40 million passengers per year by the 1930s. With the opening of the bridge, many of the K-class vessels were deemed redundant and were decommissioned. More still were decommissioned following the NSW State Government takeover of Sydney Ferries in 1951. A handful of the K-class ferries (Karingal, Karrabee, Kanangra, Kameruka) were in service until the mid-1980s having been converted to diesel in the 1930s and 1950s.

During the launch speech for Kaikai in 1906, Sydney Ferries acknowledged they were deliberately naming their vessels with Aboriginal words starting with the letter "K".

List of K-class vessels

Notes

References
 
 
 
 
 ferriesofsydney.com

See also
 List of Sydney Harbour ferries
 Timeline of Sydney Harbour ferries

External links

Ferry transport in Sydney
Ships built in New South Wales
Wooden steamships of Australia
History of Sydney
Sydney K-class ferries
Ferry classes